Jean Carol (born April 13) is an American actress.

Early life
Carol was born in Hillsdale, New Jersey. She acted in New York theatrical productions as a child. When she was 11, her family relocated to Miami. She graduated from Florida State University, where she studied theater and broadcasting.

Career
In the early 1980s, Carol hosted a public affairs program on WESH in Orlando and later she hosted and produced PM Magazine in Orlando and San Diego.

Carol's most high-profile acting role was as Nadine Cooper in the daytime drama Guiding Light. She joined the show in 1988 and quickly became a popular comic foil. At the 1990 Soap Opera Digest Awards she was awarded Outstanding Female Newcomer. Her stint on the show lasted for seven years until the character of Nadine was murdered by Brent Lawrence. She returned to Guiding Light for one special episode on Mother's Day 2006.

Among Carol's other appearances are roles on Sunset Beach, Monk, Six Feet Under, and Arli$$. She also appeared in the 1989 horror comedy Speak of the Devil and the 2015 sex comedy Promoted.

In 2016 Carol joined the digital series Misguided and made her debut as 'Jeva Jones' in February 2017 during the second season of the series.

Filmography

Film

Television

References

External links

Year of birth missing (living people)
Living people
American film actresses
American soap opera actresses
American stage actresses
American television actresses
21st-century American women